Lyubov Nikitenko (married Kononova; born 6 December 1948) is a Kazakhstani former track and field hurdler for the Soviet Union. Born in Kostanay, she competed in the 100 metres hurdles at the 1976 Summer Olympics, where she was disqualified in the semi-finals.

Indoors in the 60 metres hurdles she won the gold medal at the 1977 European Athletics Indoor Championships and set a world record (unratified) time of 7.9 seconds in 1975 and 1976.

She also won a bronze medal at the 1977 IAAF World Cup, and was a five-time Soviet national champion.

International competitions

National titles
Soviet Athletics Championships
100 m hurdles: 1971, 1973, 1977
Soviet Indoor Athletics Championships
60 m hurdles: 1972, 1975

References

Living people
1948 births
People from Kostanay
Soviet female hurdlers
Kazakhstani female hurdlers
Olympic athletes of the Soviet Union
Athletes (track and field) at the 1976 Summer Olympics
World record setters in athletics (track and field)